Ebonite International was a parent company that oversaw the manufacture of bowling balls and bowling equipment. Their headquarters and primary manufacturing facility was located in Hopkinsville, Kentucky before closing on November 15, 2019.

The manufacturing plant now houses the CtD Education Center, owned by Ronald Hickland, Jr., a former Ebonite ball core designer.

Expansion in 2007
In addition to Ebonite-branded bowling balls, Ebonite International has also owned the Hammer-branded line of balls since 2002. In February 2007, Ebonite announced that it had acquired one of the industry's leading manufacturers, Columbia Industries. Since the acquisition, they have produced that company's signature Columbia 300 line of balls. That acquisition also resulted in Ebonite gaining control of Dynothane Inc., which produced the Dyno-Thane brand, and Track International, which produces the popular line of Track bowling balls. Dynothane and Track had been owned by Columbia, and were transferred to Ebonite when the latter purchased the former.

Acquisition by Brunswick
On November 15, 2019, the company announced that its assets and patents had been sold to Brunswick Bowling Products, LLC. However, the purchase agreement did not include the Hopkinsville manufacturing plant, and it was subsequently closed. As of late 2019, Brunswick announced they would continue to produce the four EBI brands in its own manufacturing plants.

Brands
Ebonite has marketed bowling balls and other ten-pin bowling equipment under several brand names:

 Ebonite
 Hammer Bowling
 Columbia 300
 Track
 Robby's
 Powerhouse

Notes

External links
 Company homepage

Ten-pin bowling equipment manufacturers
Companies based in Kentucky
Hopkinsville, Kentucky